Muljava is a village in the Municipality of Ivančna Gorica in central Slovenia. The area is part of the traditional region of Lower Carniola. The municipality is now included in the Central Slovenia Statistical Region.

History
Muljava was originally two villages: Muljava and Zavod. The two were united into a single village when house numbers were assigned in the village.

Jurčič farm

Muljava is best known as the birthplace of the Slovene writer Josip Jurčič and the farm where he was born is now a small museum.

Church

The local church is dedicated to the Assumption of Mary and belongs to the Parish of Krka.

References

External links

Muljava on Geopedia

Populated places in the Municipality of Ivančna Gorica